{{DISPLAYTITLE:Kir2.6}}

The Kir2.6 also known as inward rectifier potassium channel 18 is a protein that in humans is encoded by the KCNJ18 gene. Kir2.6 is an inward-rectifier potassium ion channel.

Function 

Inwardly rectifying potassium channels, such as Kir2.6, maintain resting membrane potential in excitable cells and aid in repolarization of cells following depolarization. Kir2.6 is primarily expressed in skeletal muscle and is transcriptionally regulated by thyroid hormone.

Clinical significance 

Mutations in this gene have been linked to thyrotoxic periodic paralysis.

References

Ion channels